"Leave It Alone" is a song by Canadian alternative rock group Moist. It was released in September 1996 as the lead single from their second studio album, Creature. It is the band's highest-charting single  in Canada, reaching number three on the RPM Top Singles chart and number six on the Alternative chart. The song was ranked number 10 on CILQ-FM's Top 107 songs of 1997.

Charts

Weekly charts

Year-end charts

Release history

References

External links

Moist (Canadian band) songs
1996 singles
1996 songs
Arista Records singles
EMI Records singles
Songs written by David Usher